The Sesiidae or clearwing moths are a diurnal moth family in the order Lepidoptera known for their Batesian mimicry in both appearance and behaviour of various Hymenoptera.

The family consists of 165 genera spread over two subfamilies, containing in total 1525 species and 49 subspecies, most of which occur in the tropics, though there are many species in the Holarctic region as well, including over a hundred species known to occur in Europe.

Morphology

Sesiidae are characterized by their hymenopteriform Batesian mimicry, frequently of identifiable species. Most species of Sesiidae have wings with areas where scales are nearly completely absent, resulting in partial, marked transparency. Forewings are commonly elongated and narrow in the basal half. In many species, the abdomen is elongated, with an anal tuft, and striped or ringed yellow, red or white, sometimes very brightly so. Legs are long, thin and frequently coloured, and in some species the hind-legs are elongated. In European species, the wing span ranges from 8 to 48 mm.

Larvae lack pigment. Segments of the thorax are somewhat enlarged.

Behaviour
The larvae of the Sesiidae typically bore in wood or burrow in plant roots. Many species are serious pests of fruit-tree or timber cultivation, or crop plants (e.g. Melittia spp. on squash) (Edwards et al., 1999). Larval development lasts 1–4 years, pupal stage 10–20 days.

Adults are diurnally active. Movements, including flight, mimic those of Hymenoptera spp. Specimens are commonly collected using pheromone lures.

Taxonomy
Subfamily Tinthiinae Le Cerf, 1917
Tribe Tinthiini Le Cerf, 1917
Microsphecia Bartel, 1912
Tinthia Walker, [1865]
Sophona Walker, 1856
Zenodoxus Grote & Robinson, 1868
Conopsia Strand, [1913]
Paranthrenopsis Le Cerf, 1911
Entrichella Bryk, 1947
Negotinthia Gorbunov, 2001
Trichocerota Hampson, [1893]
Paradoxecia Hampson, 1919
Rectala Bryk, 1947
Ceratocorema Hampson, [1893]
Caudicornia Bryk, 1947
Bidentotinthia Arita & Gorbunov, 2003
Tarsotinthia Arita & Gorbunov, 2003
Tyrictaca Walker, 1862
Tribe Pennisetiini Naumann, 1971
Pennisetia Dehne, 1850
Corematosetia Kallies & Arita, 2001
Tribe Paraglosseciini Gorbunov & Eitschberger 1990
Oligophlebia Hampson, [1893]
Isothamnis Meyrick, 1935
Cyanophlebia Arita & Gorbunov, 2001
Lophocnema Turner, 1917
Diapyra Turner, 1917
Micrecia Hampson, 1919
Tribe Similipepsini Špatenka, Laštuvka, Gorbunov, Toševski & Arita, 1993
Similipepsis Le Cerf, 1911
Gasterostena Arita & Gorbunov, 2003
Subfamily Sesiinae Boisduval, 1828
Tribe Sesiini Boisduval, 1828
Sesia Fabricius, 1775
Trilochana Moore, 1879
Cyanosesia Gorbunov & Arita, 1995
Sphecosesia Hampson, 1910
Teinotarsina Felder, 1874
Lenyra Walker, 1856
Aegerosphecia Le Cerf, 1916
Lamellisphecia Kallies & Arita, 2004
Clavigera Kallies & Arita, 2004
Eusphecia Le Cerf, 1937
Scasiba Matsumura, 1931
Callisphecia Le Cerf, 1916
Madasphecia Viette, 1982
Melittosesia Bartsch, 2009
Barbasphecia Pühringer & Sáfián 2011
Afrokona Fischer, 2006
Hovaesia Le Cerf, 1957
Lenyrhova Le Cerf, 1957
Tribe Cissuvorini Duckworth & Eichlin 1977
Toleria Walker, [1865]
Chimaerosphecia Strand, [1916]
Glossosphecia Hampson, 1919
Cissuvora Engelhardt, 1946
Dasysphecia Hampson, 1919
Tribe Osminiini Duckworth & Eichlin 1977
Osminia Le Cerf, 1917
Chamanthedon Le Cerf, 1916
Microsynanthedon Viette, [1955]
Calasesia Beutenmüller, 1899
Aenigmina Le Cerf, 1912
Cabomina de Freina, 2008
Pyranthrene Hampson, 1919
Homogyna Le Cerf, 1911
Aschistophleps Hampson [1893]
Pyrophleps Arita & Gorbunov, 2000
Heterosphecia Le Cerf, 1916
Melanosphecia Le Cerf, 1916
Akaisphecia Gorbunov & Arita, 1995
Callithia Le Cerf, 1916
Tribe Melittiini Le Cerf, 1917
Melittia Hübner, [1819]
Desmopoda Felder, 1874
Agriomelissa Meyrick, 1931
Afromelittia Gorbunov & Arita, 1997
Cephalomelittia Gorbunov & Arita, 1995
Macroscelesia Hampson, 1919
Tribe Paranthrenini Niculescu, 1964
Nokona Matsumura 1931
Taikona Arita & Gorbunov, 2001
Scoliokona Kallies & Arita, 1998
Rubukona Fischer, 2007
Adixoa Hampson, [1893]
Pramila Moore, 1879
Vitacea Engelhardt, 1946
Phlogothauma Butler, 1882
Paranthrene Hübner, [1819]
Pseudosesia Felder, 1861
Albuna Edwards, 1881
Euhagena Edwards, 1881
Sincara Walker, 1856
Tirista Walker, [1865]
Thyranthrene Hampson, 1919
Sura Walker, 1856
Tribe Synanthedonini Niculescu, 1964
Synanthedon Hübner, [1819]
Ravitria Gorbunov & Arita, 2000
Kantipuria Gorbunov & Arita, 1999
Kemneriella Bryk, 1947
Ichneumenoptera Hampson, [1893]
Paranthrenella Strand, [1916]
Anthedonella Gorbunov & Arita, 1999
Schimia Gorbunov & Arita, 1999
Uncothedon Gorbunov & Arita, 1999
Palmia Beutenmüller, 1896
Podosesia Möschler, 1879
Sannina Walker, 1856
Nyctaegeria Le Cerf, 1914
Carmenta Edwards, 1881
Penstemonia Engelhardt, 1946
Camaegeria Strand, 1914
Malgassesia Le Cerf, 1922
Lophoceps Hampson, 1919
Tipulamima Holland, 1893
Rodolphia Le Cerf, 1911
Alcathoe Edwards, 1882
Pseudalcathoe Le Cerf, 1916
Macrotarsipus Hampson, [1893]
Grypopalpia Hampson, 1919
Hymenoclea Engelhardt, 1946
Euryphrissa Butler, 1874
Leptaegeria Le Cerf, 1916
Aegerina Le Cerf, 1917
Stenosphecia Le Cerf, 1917
Bembecia Hübner, [1819]
Pyropteron Newman, 1832
Dipchasphecia Capuse, 1973
Chamaesphecia Spuler, 1910
Weismanniola Naumann, 1971
Ichneumonella Gorbunov & Arita, 2005
Crinipus Hampson, 1896
Genera unassigned to tribe
Alonina Walker, 1856
Anaudia Wallengren, 1863
Augangela Meyrick, 1932
Austrosetia Felder, 1874
Ceritrypetes Bradley, 1956
Conopyga Felder, 1861
Echidgnathia Hampson, 1919
Episannina Aurivillius, 1905
Erismatica Meyrick, 1933
Gymnosophistis Meyrick, 1934
Hymenosphecia Le Cerf, 1917
Isocylindra Meyrick, 1930
Lepidopoda Hampson, 1900
Leuthneria Dalla Torre, 1925
Megalosphecia Le Cerf, 1916
Melisophista Meyrick, 1927
Metasphecia Le Cerf, 1917
Mimocrypta Naumann, 1971
Monopetalotaxis Wallengren, 1859
Pedalonina Gaede, 1929
Proaegeria Le Cerf, 1916
Pseudomelittia Le Cerf, 1917
Tradescanticola Hampson, 1919
Uranothyris Meyrick, 1933
Vespanthedon Le Cerf, 1917
Xenoses Durrant, 1924
Zhuosesia Yang, 1977

References

Edwards, E.D., Gentili, P., Horak, M., Kristensen, N.P. and Nielsen, E.S. (1999). The cossoid/sesioid assemblage. Ch. 11, pp. 183–185 in Kristensen, N.P. (Ed.). Lepidoptera, Moths and Butterflies. Volume 1: Evolution, Systematics, and Biogeography. Handbuch der Zoologie. Eine Naturgeschichte der Stämme des Tierreiches / Handbook of Zoology. A Natural History of the phyla of the Animal Kingdom. Band / Volume IV Arthropoda: Insecta Teilband / Part 35: 491 pp. Walter de Gruyter, Berlin, New York.

External links
Dr. Franz Pühringer: Sesiidae
Sesiidae of Serbia in English
 Synanthedon exitiosa, peachtree borer on the UF / IFAS  Featured Creatures Web site
 Synanthedon scitula, dogwood borer on the UF / IFAS  Featured Creatures Web site
Australian moths online Gallery
 Images of Sesiidae moths in New Zealand
Deltakey  Family description and nineteenth century plates.

 
Moth families
Taxa named by Jean Baptiste Boisduval